Elżbieta Aleksandra Wiśniowska (born 16 June 1975 in Ząbkowice Śląskie) is a Polish politician. She was elected to the Sejm on 25 September 2005, getting 4839 votes in 14 Nowy Sącz district as a candidate from Samoobrona Rzeczpospolitej Polskiej list.

See also
Members of Polish Sejm 2005-2007

External links
Elżbieta Wiśniowska - parliamentary page - includes declarations of interest, voting record, and transcripts of speeches.

1975 births
Cardinal Stefan Wyszyński University in Warsaw alumni
Living people
People from Ząbkowice Śląskie
Members of the Polish Sejm 2005–2007
Women members of the Sejm of the Republic of Poland
Self-Defence of the Republic of Poland politicians
21st-century Polish women politicians